

Belgium
 Congo Free State – Théophile Wahis, Governor-General of the Congo Free State (1892–1908)

France
 French Somaliland – Léonce Lagarde, Governor of French Somaliland (1888–1899)
 Guinea –
 Noël-Eugène Ballay, Lieutenant-Governor of Guinea (1893–1895)
 Paul Jean François Cousturier, Lieutenant-Governor of Guinea (1895–1896)

Japan
 Taiwan – Kabayama Sukenori, Governor-General of Taiwan (21 May 1895 – June 1896)

Portugal
 Angola – Álvaro Ferreira, Governor-General of Angola (1893–1896)

United Kingdom
 Bermuda -
 Malta Colony – Arthur Fremantle, Governor of Malta (1893–1899)
 Colony of Natal – Sir Walter Hely-Hutchinson (1893–1901)
 New South Wales
 Sir Robert Duff, Governor of New South Wales (1893–1895)
 Viscount Hampden, Governor of New South Wales (1895–1899)
 North-Eastern Rhodesia
 British South Africa Company establishes colony of North-Eastern Rhodesia, 1 July
 Patrick William Forbes, Administrator of North-Eastern Rhodesia (1895–1897)
 Queensland – Field Marshal Sir Henry Norman, Governor of Queensland (1889–1895)
 Tasmania – Jenico Preston, Lord Gormanston, Governor of Tasmania (1893–1900)
 South Australia
 Algernon Keith-Falconer, Lord Kintore, Governor of South Australia (1889–1895)
 Sir Thomas Buxton, Governor of South Australia (1895–1899)
 Victoria
 John Hope, Earl of Hopetoun, Governor of Victoria (1889–1895)
 Thomas, Earl Brassey, Governor of Victoria (1895–1900)
 Western Australia
 Sir William Robinson, Governor of Western Australia (1890–1895)
 Lieutenant-Colonel Gerard Smith, Governor of Western Australia (1895–1900)

Germany
 Togo
 Jesko von Puttkamer, (1892–1895)
 August Köhler, (1895–1902)
 Deutsch Südwest-Afrika – Major Theodor Leutwein, (1894–1905)

Colonial governors
Colonial governors
1895